Sebastiano Perissi (1631 – November 1701) was a Roman Catholic prelate who served as Bishop of Grosseto (1700–1701) and Bishop of Nocera de' Pagani (1692–1700).

Biography
Sebastiano Perissi was born in Boccheggiano, Italy in 1631, but raised in Siena. Perissi obtained the degree of Doctor in utroque iure in Siena. He was Auditor in the nunciature in Florence, and then Vicar General of Naples. On 9 January 1692, he was appointed during the papacy of Pope Innocent XII as Bishop of Nocera de' Pagani.
On 20 January 1692, he was consecrated bishop by Bandino Panciatici, Cardinal-Priest of San Pancrazio, with Giuseppe de Lazzara, Bishop of Alife, and Giuseppe Felice Barlacci, Bishop Emeritus of Narni, serving as co-consecrators. 
On 28 May 1700, he was appointed during the papacy of Pope Innocent XII as Bishop of Grosseto.
He served as Bishop of Grosseto until his death in November 1701.

Episcopal succession
While bishop, he was the principal co-consecrator of:
Giovanni Stefano Pastori, Bishop of Ventimiglia (1695);
Vincenzo della Marra, Bishop of Alessano (1695);
Daniele Scoppa,  Bishop of Nola (1695).

References

External links and additional sources
 (for Chronology of Bishops) 
 (for Chronology of Bishops)  
 (for Chronology of Bishops) 
 (for Chronology of Bishops) 

17th-century Italian Roman Catholic bishops
18th-century Italian Roman Catholic bishops
Bishops appointed by Pope Innocent XII
Bishops of Grosseto
1631 births
1701 deaths